The year 1989 involved many significant films.

Highest-grossing films

The top 10 films released in 1989 by worldwide gross are as follows:

Events
 Actress Kim Basinger and her brother Mick purchase Braselton, Georgia, for $20 million. Basinger would lose the town to her partner in the deal, the pension fund of Chicago-based Ameritech Corp., in 1993 after being forced to file for bankruptcy when a California judge ordered her to pay $7.4 million for refusing to honor a verbal contract to star in the film Boxing Helena.
 A director's cut of Lawrence of Arabia is released with a 227-minute length. The restoration was undertaken by Robert A. Harris under the supervision of director David Lean.
 April 23 – Field of Dreams, starring Kevin Costner, James Earl Jones, and Burt Lancaster, is released.
 May 24 – Indiana Jones and the Last Crusade is released. It is the third installment of the Indiana Jones series.
 June 13 – The James Bond film Licence to Kill is released. It would be followed by years of legal wrangling over the future of the popular series. The next Bond film, GoldenEye, is not released until 1995.
 June 16 – Ghostbusters II is released.
 June 23
 Batman is released, going on to gross more than $410 million worldwide, and establishing the public and critical attention of director Tim Burton.
 Honey, I Shrunk the Kids is released and marks the directorial debut of visual effects supervisor Joe Johnston, who later went on to direct The Rocketeer, Jumanji, October Sky, Jurassic Park III, and Captain America: The First Avenger.
 June 30 - Do the Right Thing released.  It was added to the National Film Registry in 1999.
 July 7 – Lethal Weapon 2 is released and becomes the highest-grossing film in the franchise. As well as the highest grossing R-rated film of the year at the domestic box office.
 July 11 – Screen, stage, and Shakespearian legend Laurence Olivier died peacefully in his home in England, after appearing in his last filmed role as an old soldier in War Requiem.
 August 2 – Ron Howard's family comedy Parenthood, starring Steve Martin, Tom Hulce, and Rick Moranis, is released.
 September 28 – Sony announce its intention to buy Columbia Pictures and Tri-Star Pictures.  The deal is completed in November for a total cost of nearly $5 billion.  They appoint Peter Guber and Jon Peters as co-chairman, in a further deal that cost up to $1 billion, after settling a lawsuit with Warner Bros.
 November 7 - Andrew G. Vajna agrees to sell his stake in Carolco Pictures to his co-chairman and co-founder Mario Kassar for $106 million.
 November 17 – The Little Mermaid becomes a critical and commercial success and brings new life to Walt Disney Feature Animation. The Little Mermaid also reinvigorated public and critical interest in The Walt Disney Company, which would become one of the most prestigious corporations of the 1990s.
 November 22 – Back to the Future Part II is released.

Awards

1989 wide-release films

January–March

April–June

July–September

October–December

Notable films released in 1989
United States unless stated

A
 A Better Tomorrow III, directed by Tsui Hark, starring Chow Yun-fat, Anita Mui and Tony Leung – (Hong Kong)
 The Abyss, directed by James Cameron, starring Ed Harris and Mary Elizabeth Mastrantonio
 All About Ah-Long (Ah Long dik gu si), starring Chow Yun-fat and Sylvia Chang – (Hong Kong)
 All Dogs Go To Heaven, directed by Don Bluth, voices of Burt Reynolds and Dom DeLuise – (Ireland/U.K./U.S.)
 Always, directed by Steven Spielberg, starring Richard Dreyfuss, Holly Hunter, John Goodman and Audrey Hepburn
 Amanece, que no es poco (Sunrise, which is not a small thing) – (Spain)
 Apartment Zero (Conviviendo con la muerte), directed by Martin Donovan, starring Colin Firth – Golden Space Needle award – (Argentina)

B
 The BFG, voice of David Jason – (U.K.)
 Babar: The Movie – (Canada/France)
 Back to the Future Part II, directed by Robert Zemeckis, starring Michael J. Fox, Christopher Lloyd and Mary Steenburgen
 Bashu, the Little Stranger (Bashu, gharibeye koochak) – (Iran)
 Batman, directed by Tim Burton, starring Michael Keaton, Jack Nicholson, Kim Basinger, Jack Palance and Robert Wuhl
 Before the Bat's Flight Is Done (Mielőtt befejezi röptét a denevér) – (Hungary)
 Bert Rigby, You're a Fool, directed by Carl Reiner, starring Robert Lindsay, Robbie Coltrane and Anne Bancroft
 Best of the Best, starring Eric Roberts, James Earl Jones and Sally Kirkland
 The Big Picture, directed by Christopher Guest, starring Kevin Bacon, Michael McKean, Teri Hatcher, Jennifer Jason Leigh and Martin Short
 Bill & Ted's Excellent Adventure, starring Keanu Reeves, Alex Winter and George Carlin
 Black Rain, directed by Ridley Scott, starring Michael Douglas, Andy García and Kate Capshaw – (United States)
 Black Rain (Kuroi ame), directed by Shohei Imamura – (Japan)
 Black Rainbow, directed by Mike Hodges, starring Rosanna Arquette, Jason Robards and Tom Hulce
 Black Rose Is an Emblem of Sorrow, Red Rose Is an Emblem of Love (Chyornaya roza – emblema pechali, krasnaya roza – emblema lyubvi) – (U.S.S.R.)
 The Blasphemers' Banquet
 Blaze, directed by Ron Shelton, starring Paul Newman and Lolita Davidovich
 Blind Fury, directed by Phillip Noyce, starring Rutger Hauer
 Bloodhounds of Broadway, starring Matt Dillon, Jennifer Grey, Julie Hagerty, Rutger Hauer, Madonna, Esai Morales and Randy Quaid
 Blood Red, directed by Peter Masterson, starring Eric Roberts, Julia Roberts, Dennis Hopper, Burt Young and Giancarlo Giannini
 Blue Steel
 Born on the Fourth of July, directed by Oliver Stone, starring Tom Cruise—Golden Globe Award for Best Picture (Drama)
 Breaking In, directed by Bill Forsyth, starring Burt Reynolds and Casey Siemaszko
 The 'Burbs, directed by Joe Dante starring Tom Hanks, Carrie Fisher and Bruce Dern
 Bye Bye Blues, starring Rebecca Jenkins and Michael Ontkean – (Canada)

C
 Cage, directed by Lang Elliott, starring Reb Brown and Lou Ferrigno
 Cameron's Closet, starring Scott Curtis
 Casualties of War, directed by Brian De Palma, starring Michael J. Fox and Sean Penn
 Cat Chaser, directed by Abel Ferrara, starring Peter Weller and Kelly McGillis
 Chameleon Street, directed by and starring Wendell B. Harris, Jr.
 Chances Are, starring Cybill Shepherd, Robert Downey, Jr., Ryan O'Neal and Mary Stuart Masterson
 Chandni (Moonlight), starring Sridevi – (India)
 Checking Out, starring Jeff Daniels
 Cheetah
 A City of Sadness (Beiqing chengshi), starring Tony Leung – Golden Lion award – (Taiwan)
 Cohen and Tate, starring Roy Scheider and Adam Baldwin
 Cold Feet, starring Keith Carradine, Sally Kirkland and Tom Waits
 Communion, starring Christopher Walken
 The Cook, the Thief, His Wife & Her Lover, directed by Peter Greenaway, starring Richard Bohringer, Michael Gambon and Helen Mirren – (U.K.)
 Cousins, starring Ted Danson, Isabella Rossellini, Sean Young and William Petersen
 Crimes and Misdemeanors, directed by and starring Woody Allen, with Mia Farrow, Alan Alda, Martin Landau, Sam Waterston and Anjelica Huston
 Criminal Law, starring Gary Oldman and Kevin Bacon
 Crusoe, starring Aidan Quinn – (U.K.)
 Cyborg, starring Jean-Claude Van Damme

D
 Dad, starring Jack Lemmon, Ted Danson, Ethan Hawke, Olympia Dukakis, Kathy Baker and Kevin Spacey
 Dead Bang, starring Don Johnson
 Dead Calm, directed by Phillip Noyce, starring Sam Neill, Nicole Kidman and Billy Zane – (Australia)
 Dead Poets Society, directed by Peter Weir, starring Robin Williams, Ethan Hawke and Norman Lloyd
 DeepStar Six, starring Greg Evigan, Nancy Everhard, Cindy Pickett, Taurean Blacque and Miguel Ferrer
 Dekalog, directed by Krzysztof Kieślowski – (Poland)
 The Delinquents, starring Kylie Minogue and Charlie Schlatter – (Australia)
 Der Todesking, directed by Jörg Buttgereit – (Germany)
 Dimenticare Palermo (To Forget Palermo), directed by Francesco Rosi – (Italy)
 Disorganized Crime, starring Lou Diamond Phillips and Rubén Blades
 Do the Right Thing, directed by and starring Spike Lee, with Danny Aiello, John Turturro, Bill Nunn, Giancarlo Esposito, Ossie Davis and Ruby Dee
 Doggie Adventure, a novelty video made for dogs and released on VHS
 Dream a Little Dream, starring Corey Feldman, Corey Haim and Meredith Salenger
 The Dream Team, starring Michael Keaton, Peter Boyle, Christopher Lloyd and Stephen Furst
 Driving Miss Daisy, directed by Bruce Beresford, starring Jessica Tandy, Morgan Freeman and Dan Aykroyd – Academy and Golden Globe Awards for Best Picture
 Drugstore Cowboy, directed by Gus Van Sant, starring Matt Dillon and Kelly Lynch
 A Dry White Season, directed by Euzhan Palcy, starring Donald Sutherland, Janet Suzman, Susan Sarandon and Marlon Brando

E
 The Ear (Ucho) – (Czechoslovakia) – made in 1970 but banned until 1989
 Echoes of Paradise, directed by Phillip Noyce, starring Wendy Hughes and John Lone – (Australia)
 Eddie and the Cruisers II: Eddie Lives!, starring Michael Pare and Marina Orsini – (Canada)
 Edge of Sanity, starring Anthony Perkins
 Eeshwar, starring Anil Kapoor – (India)
 Elves, starring Dan Haggerty
 Enemies, a Love Story, directed by Paul Mazursky, starring Ron Silver, Anjelica Huston, Lena Olin and Margaret Sophie Stein
 Erik the Viking, directed by and starring Terry Jones, with Tim Robbins, Mickey Rooney and John Cleese – (U.K.)
 Everybody's Baby: The Rescue of Jessica McClure, starring Beau Bridges, Pat Hingle and Roxana Zal
 The Experts, starring John Travolta, Arye Gross and Kelly Preston

F
 The Fabulous Baker Boys, starring Jeff Bridges, Michelle Pfeiffer and Beau Bridges
 Family Business, directed by Sidney Lumet, starring Sean Connery, Dustin Hoffman and Matthew Broderick
 Farewell to the King, directed by John Milius, starring Nick Nolte and Nigel Havers
 Fat Man and Little Boy, starring Paul Newman, Dwight Schultz, John Cusack and Laura Dern
 Field of Dreams, starring Kevin Costner, Amy Madigan, James Earl Jones, Ray Liotta, Timothy Busfield and Burt Lancaster
 Fletch Lives, directed by Michael Ritchie, starring Chevy Chase, Hal Holbrook and R. Lee Ermey
 Food of the Gods II, directed by Damian Lee
 Fool's Mate (Zugzwang), starring Victoria Tennant – (West Germany)
 For Queen and Country, starring Denzel Washington – (UK/US)
 Freeze Die Come to Life (Zamri, umri, voskresni!) – (U.S.S.R.)
 Friday the 13th Part VIII: Jason Takes Manhattan, directed by Rob Hedden, starring Jensen Daggett and Scott Reeves

G
 Gang of Four, directed by Jacques Rivette, starring Bulle Ogier – (France)
 Getting It Right, starring Jane Horrocks and Helena Bonham Carter – (U.K.)
 Ghostbusters II, directed by Ivan Reitman, starring Bill Murray, Dan Aykroyd, Sigourney Weaver, Harold Ramis, Rick Moranis, Ernie Hudson, Annie Potts and Peter MacNicol
 Gleaming the Cube, starring Christian Slater
 Glory, directed by Edward Zwick, starring Matthew Broderick, Denzel Washington, Cary Elwes and Morgan Freeman
 God of Gamblers (Du shen), starring Chow Yun-fat and Andy Lau – (Hong Kong)
 Godzilla vs. Biollante – (Japan)
 A Grand Day Out, directed by Nick Park, voice of Peter Sallis - (U.K.)
 Great Balls of Fire!, directed by Jim McBride, starring Dennis Quaid, Winona Ryder and Alec Baldwin
 Gross Anatomy, starring Matthew Modine, Daphne Zuniga and Christine Lahti

H
 Harlem Nights, directed by and starring Eddie Murphy, with Richard Pryor, Danny Aiello, Jasmine Guy, Redd Foxx and Della Reese
 Hathyar, starring Dharmendra and Sanjay Dutt – (India)
 Heart of Dixie, starring Ally Sheedy, Virginia Madsen, Phoebe Cates and Treat Williams
 Heathers, directed by Michael Lehmann, starring Winona Ryder and Christian Slater
 Henry V, directed by and starring Kenneth Branagh, with Derek Jacobi, Brian Blessed, Paul Scofield and Emma Thompson – (U.K.)
 Her Alibi, starring Tom Selleck and Paulina Porizkova
 Hit List, starring Jan-Michael Vincent and Rip Torn
 Homer and Eddie, starring Whoopi Goldberg and James Belushi
 Honey, I Shrunk the Kids, starring Rick Moranis, Matt Frewer and Marcia Strassman
 A Hoof Here, a Hoof There (Kopytem sem, kopytem tam) – (Czechoslovakia)
 Houseboat Horror, starring Alan Dale – (Australia)
 How I Got Into College, starring Lara Flynn Boyle and Anthony Edwards
 How to Get Ahead in Advertising, directed by Bruce Robinson, starring Richard E. Grant – (U.K.)

I
 I Love, You Love (Ja milujem, ty miluješ) – (Czechoslovakia)
 Ice Pawn, starring Dan Haggerty
 The Icicle Thief (Ladri di saponette) – (Italy)
 Immediate Family, starring Glenn Close, James Woods and Mary Stuart Masterson
 In Country, starring Bruce Willis and Emily Lloyd
 Indiana Jones and the Last Crusade, directed by Steven Spielberg, starring Harrison Ford, Sean Connery, Alison Doody, Julian Glover and River Phoenix
 An Innocent Man, starring Tom Selleck
 Intergirl (Interdevochka) – (U.S.S.R.)
 Interrogation (Przesluchanie), directed by Ryszard Bugajski – (Poland) – banned for over 7 years, released after overthrow of communist regime in Poland
 Ivan and Alexandra – (Bulgaria)

J
 Jacknife, starring Robert De Niro, Ed Harris and Kathy Baker
 The January Man, starring Kevin Kline, Susan Sarandon, Mary Elizabeth Mastrantonio, Harvey Keitel, Danny Aiello and Rod Steiger
 Je suis le seigneur du château (I'm the King of the Castle) – (France)
 Jesus of Montreal – (Canada/France)
 Johnny Handsome, directed by Walter Hill, starring Mickey Rourke, Forest Whitaker, Ellen Barkin, Elizabeth McGovern and Morgan Freeman

K
 K-9, starring James Belushi
 The Karate Kid Part III, starring Ralph Macchio and Noriyuki "Pat" Morita
 Kickboxer, starring Jean-Claude Van Damme
 Kiki's Delivery Service (Majo no Takkyūbin), directed by Hayao Miyazaki – (Japan)
 The Killer, directed by John Woo, starring Chow Yun-fat – (Hong Kong)
 Killing Dad
 Kinjite: Forbidden Subjects, starring Charles Bronson

L
 Last Exit to Brooklyn, starring Jennifer Jason Leigh
 Lean on Me, directed by John G. Avildsen, starring Morgan Freeman
 Leningrad Cowboys Go America, directed by Aki Kaurismäki, starring Leningrad Cowboys – (Finland)
 Lethal Weapon 2, directed by Richard Donner, starring Mel Gibson and Danny Glover
 Leviathan, starring Peter Weller, Richard Crenna and Meg Foster
 Licence to Kill, 16th of James Bond series, starring Timothy Dalton, Robert Davi and Carey Lowell – (U.K.)
 Life and Nothing But (La vie et rien d'autre), directed by Bertrand Tavernier – (France)
 Listen to Me, starring Kirk Cameron, Jami Gertz and Roy Scheider, Christopher Atkins
 The Little Mermaid, directed by Ron Clements and John Musker, voices of Jodi Benson, Pat Carroll and Buddy Hackett
 Little Monsters, starring Fred Savage and Howie Mandel – (Ireland/UK/US)
 Little Nemo: Adventures in Slumberland, voices of Gabriel Damon, Mickey Rooney, René Auberjonois and Danny Mann, Bernard Erhard
 Lock Up, starring Sylvester Stallone and Donald Sutherland
 Lonesome Dove, TV film, starring Robert Duvall, Tommy Lee Jones, Diane Lane, Anjelica Huston, Chris Cooper, Ricky Schroder, Danny Glover and Frederic Forrest
 Look Who's Talking, starring John Travolta and Kirstie Alley
 Lost Angels, directed by Hugh Hudson, starring Donald Sutherland, Adam Horovitz and Amy Locane
 Loverboy, starring Patrick Dempsey, Carrie Fisher, Barbara Carrera and Kirstie Alley

M
 Maine Pyar Kiya (I Fell in Love), starring Salman Khan – (India)
 Major League, directed by David S. Ward, starring Tom Berenger, Charlie Sheen, Corbin Bernsen, James Gammon, Margaret Whitton and Wesley Snipes
 Marquis – (Belgium/France)
 The Marriage of the Blessed (Arousi-ye Khouban) – (Iran)
 Meet the Feebles, directed by Peter Jackson – (New Zealand)
 Meet the Hollowheads, starring Juliette Lewis
 The Mighty Quinn, starring Denzel Washington, Robert Townsend, Mimi Rogers and Esther Rolle
 Millennium, starring Kris Kristofferson and Cheryl Ladd
 Miracles, starring Jackie Chan, Anita Mui and Richard Ng (Hong Kong)
 Miss Firecracker, starring Holly Hunter, Tim Robbins, Mary Steenburgen, Alfre Woodard and Scott Glenn
 Monsieur Hire, directed by Patrice Leconte, starring Michel Blanc and Sandrine Bonnaire – (France)
 Mother (Mat) – (U.S.S.R.)
 Music Box, directed by Costa-Gavras, starring Jessica Lange, Armin Mueller-Stahl, Frederic Forrest and Lukas Haas – Golden Bear award (for 1990)
 My 20th Century – (Hungary/West Germany)
 My Left Foot, directed by Jim Sheridan, starring Daniel Day-Lewis and Brenda Fricker – (Ireland/U.K.)
 Mystery Train, directed by Jim Jarmusch, starring Youki Kudoh, Masatoshi Nagase, Steve Buscemi and Joe Strummer – (Japan/United States)
 Milo and Otis, narrated by Dudley Moore, directed by Masanori Hata (English translation)

N
 National Lampoon's Christmas Vacation, directed by Jeremiah S. Chechik, starring Chevy Chase, Beverly D'Angelo and Randy Quaid
 The Newcomer in The Cabbage
 New York Stories, trilogy directed by Martin Scorsese, Francis Ford Coppola and Woody Allen, starring Nick Nolte, Rosanna Arquette, Mia Farrow and Talia Shire
 Next of Kin, starring Patrick Swayze
 Night Game, starring Roy Scheider
 A Nightmare on Drug Street, starring Adam Jeffries
 A Nightmare on Elm Street 5: The Dream Child directed by Stephen Hopkins, starting Robert Englund and Lisa Wilcox
 No Holds Barred, starring Hulk Hogan
 Nowhere to Run, directed by Carl Franklin, starring David Carradine

O
 O Sangue (Blood) – (Portugal)
 Old Gringo, starring Jane Fonda, Gregory Peck, Jimmy Smits
 Out of the Dark, starring Karen Black and Bud Cort

P
 The Package, directed by Andrew Davis, starring Gene Hackman, Joanna Cassidy and Tommy Lee Jones
 The Paper Wedding, starring Geneviève Bujold – (Canada)
 Parenthood, directed by Ron Howard, starring Steve Martin, Mary Steenburgen, Jason Robards, Dianne Wiest, Rick Moranis, Tom Hulce and Martha Plimpton
 Parents, directed by Bob Balaban, starring Randy Quaid and Mary Beth Hurt
 Pedicab Driver (Qun long xi feng), directed by and starring Sammo Hung – (Hong Kong)
 Penn & Teller Get Killed
 Pet Sematary, directed by Mary Lambert written by Stephen King, starring Dale Midkiff, Fred Gwynne, Denise Crosby and Miko Hughes
 Physical Evidence, directed by Michael Crichton, starring Burt Reynolds and Theresa Russell
 Pink Cadillac, starring Clint Eastwood and Bernadette Peters
 Prancer, starring Sam Elliott and Cloris Leachman
 The Punisher, starring Dolph Lundgren
 Puppet Master, starring Paul Le Mat

R
 The Rainbow, directed by Ken Russell, starring Sammi Davis, Paul McGann, Amanda Donohoe and Glenda Jackson – (U.K.)
 Ramji Rav Speaking – (India)
 Red Scorpion, starring Dolph Lundgren
 Relentless, starring Judd Nelson and Robert Loggia
 Renegades, starring Kiefer Sutherland and Lou Diamond Phillips
 The Return of the Musketeers, directed by Richard Lester, starring Michael York, Frank Finlay, Richard Chamberlain and Kim Cattrall – (U.K./France/Spain)
 Reunion, starring Jason Robards – (U.K.)
 La Révolution française (The French Revolution), starring Klaus Maria Brandauer – (France/West Germany/Italy/U.K.)
 Road House, starring Patrick Swayze, Kelly Lynch, Ben Gazzara and Sam Elliott
 Roadkill – (Canada)
 Roger & Me, a documentary by Michael Moore
 Rojo Amanecer (Red Dawn) – (Mexico)
 Rosalie Goes Shopping, starring Marianne Sägebrecht and Judge Reinhold – (West Germany)

S
 Santa Sangre (Holy Blood) – (Mexico)
 Say Anything..., directed by Cameron Crowe, starring John Cusack, Ione Skye, John Mahoney
 Scandal, directed by Michael Caton-Jones, starring Joanne Whalley, John Hurt, Ian McKellen, Bridget Fonda – (U.K.)
 Scenes from the Class Struggle in Beverly Hills, directed by Paul Bartel, starring Jacqueline Bisset, Ed Begley, Jr., Rebecca Schaeffer
 Sea of Love, directed by Harold Becker, starring Al Pacino, Ellen Barkin, John Goodman
 Second Sight, starring John Larroquette, Bronson Pinchot, Stuart Pankin
 See No Evil, Hear No Evil, starring Gene Wilder and Richard Pryor
 See You in the Morning, starring Jeff Bridges, Alice Krige, Farrah Fawcett
 The Servant (Sluga) – (U.S.S.R.)
 The Seventh Continent (Der siebente Kontinent), directed by Michael Haneke – (Austria)
 Sex, Lies, and Videotape, directed by Steven Soderbergh, starring James Spader, Andie MacDowell, Peter Gallagher, Laura San Giacomo—Palme d'Or award
 Shag, starring Phoebe Cates, Bridget Fonda, Annabeth Gish
 Shaso – (Japan)
 She-Devil, directed by Susan Seidelman, starring Meryl Streep, Roseanne Barr, Ed Begley, Jr.
 She's Out of Control, starring Tony Danza
 Shirley Valentine, directed by Lewis Gilbert, starring Pauline Collins (BAFTA for best actress) – (U.K.)
 Shocker, directed by Wes Craven, starring Michael Murphy, Peter Berg, Mitch Pileggi, Cami Cooper
 Signs of Life, starring Beau Bridges and Kathy Bates
 Sinbad of the Seven Seas, starring Lou Ferrigno
 Sing, starring Lorraine Bracco
 Skin Deep, directed by Blake Edwards, starring John Ritter
 Slaves of New York, directed by James Ivory, starring Bernadette Peters
 Slipstream, starring Mark Hamill, Bill Paxton, Ben Kingsley
 Society, starring Billy Warlock
 Souvenir, starring Christopher Plummer
 Speed Zone, starring John Candy, Joe Flaherty, Eugene Levy, Tim Matheson, Donna Dixon, the Smothers Brothers
 Spider's Web (Das Spinnennetz), directed by Bernhard Wicki – (West Germany)
 Splendor, starring Marcello Mastroianni – (Italy)
 Split
 Star Trek V: The Final Frontier, directed by and starring William Shatner, with Leonard Nimoy, Laurence Luckinbill
 Staying Together, directed by Lee Grant, starring Sean Astin, Stockard Channing, Melinda Dillon, Levon Helm, Dermot Mulroney, Daphne Zuniga
 Steel Magnolias, directed by Herbert Ross, starring Sally Field, Julia Roberts, Dolly Parton, Olympia Dukakis, Shirley MacLaine, Daryl Hannah
 Strapless, directed by David Hare, starring Blair Brown, Bruno Ganz, Bridget Fonda – (U.K.)
 The Striker with Number 9 (I fanela me to '9') – (Greece)
 Sweet Home – (Japan)
 Sweetie, directed by Jane Campion – (Australia)

T
 The Tall Guy, directed by Mel Smith, starring Jeff Goldblum, Emma Thompson and Rowan Atkinson – (U.K.)
 Tango & Cash, starring Sylvester Stallone and Kurt Russell
 Tap, starring Gregory Hines and Sammy Davis, Jr.
 Ten Little Indians, starring Donald Pleasence, Herbert Lom, Brenda Vaccaro and Frank Stallone – (U.K.)
 Tetsuo: The Iron Man – (Japan)
 Thick Skinned (Peaux de vaches), starring Sandrine Bonnaire – (France)
 Three Fugitives, starring Nick Nolte and Martin Short
 Too Beautiful for You (Trop belle pour toi), directed by Bertrand Blier, starring Gérard Depardieu and Carole Bouquet – (France)
 Triumph of the Spirit, starring Willem Dafoe
 Troop Beverly Hills, starring Shelley Long, Betty Thomas and Craig T. Nelson
 Tropical Snow, starring David Carradine
 True Love – won the Grand Jury Prize at the Sundance Film Festival
 Turner & Hooch, starring Tom Hanks, Mare Winningham, Craig T. Nelson and Reginald VelJohnson

U
 UHF, written by and starring "Weird Al" Yankovic
 Uncle Buck, directed by John Hughes, starring John Candy and Amy Madigan

V
 Valmont, directed by Miloš Forman, starring Colin Firth, Annette Bening, Meg Tilly, Fairuza Balk and Henry Thomas – (United States/France)
 Vampire's Kiss, starring Nicolas Cage, María Conchita Alonso and Jennifer Beals
 Violent Cop (Sono otoko, kyōbō ni tsuki), directed by and starring Takeshi Kitano – (Japan)

W
 Waltzing Regitze (Dansen med Regitze) – (Denmark)
 Warlock, starring Julian Sands
 The War of the Roses, directed by and starring Danny DeVito, with Michael Douglas and Kathleen Turner
 War Requiem, starring Laurence Olivier in his final role – (U.K.)
 Weekend at Bernie's, directed by Ted Kotcheff, starring Andrew McCarthy and Jonathan Silverman
 Welcome Home, directed by Franklin Schaffner, starring Kris Kristofferson, JoBeth Williams, Sam Waterston and Brian Keith
 We're No Angels, directed by Neil Jordan, starring Robert De Niro, Sean Penn, Demi Moore, Hoyt Axton, Bruno Kirby and John C. Reilly
 What Time is it? (Che ora è?), directed by Ettore Scola, starring Marcello Mastroianni – (Italy)
 When Harry Met Sally..., directed by Rob Reiner, starring Billy Crystal, Meg Ryan, Bruno Kirby and Carrie Fisher
 When the Whales Came, starring Paul Scofield, David Threlfall and Helen Mirren – (U.K.)
 Who's Harry Crumb?, starring John Candy, Annie Potts, Jeffrey Jones, Barry Corbin, Tim Thomerson and Shawnee Smith
 Why Has Bodhi-Dharma Left for the East? (Dalmaga dongjjok-euro gan ggadakeun?) – (South Korea)
 Wicked Stepmother, starring Bette Davis, Barbara Carrera and Colleen Camp
 Willy the Sparrow (Vili, a veréb) – (Hungary)
 Wilt, starring Griff Rhys Jones and Mel Smith – (U.K.)
 Winter People, directed by Ted Kotcheff, starring Kurt Russell, Kelly McGillis and Lloyd Bridges
 The Winter War (Talvisota) – (Finland)
 The Wizard, starring Fred Savage, Luke Edwards, Jenny Lewis, Beau Bridges and Christian Slater
 Wodaabe - Herdsmen of the Sun (Wodaabe – Die Hirten der Sonne), directed by Werner Herzog – (West Germany)
 The Women on the Roof
 Worth Winning, starring Mark Harmon, Madeleine Stowe and Lesley Ann Warren

Y
 Yaaba – (Burkina Faso)

Births
 January 1 – Adele Haenel, French actress
 January 3 – Alex D. Linz, American actor
 January 8 - Karan Soni, Indian-American actor
 January 9 – Nina Dobrev, Bulgarian-Canadian actress and model
 January 13 - Andy Allo, Cameroonian-American singer-songwriter and actress
 January 14 - Emma Greenwell, American-born English actress
 January 16 - Rila Fukushima, Japanese actress and model
 January 17 – Kelly Marie Tran, American actress
 January 23 – April Pearson, English actress
 January 20 – Piret Krumm, Estonian actress 
 January 26 – Hannah Arterton, American actress
 January 30 - Khleo Thomas, American actor
 February 1 - Marco Pigossi, Brazilian actor 
 February 3 - Ryne Sanborn, American former actor
 February 4 
 Märt Pius, Estonian actor
 Priit Pius, Estonian actor
 February 5 – Jeremy Sumpter, American actor
 February 10 – Olga Korsak, Latvian actress
 February 12 - Odelya Halevi, Israeli actress
 February 13
 Carly McKillip, Canadian actress and singer
 Katie Volding, American actress
 February 16 – Elizabeth Olsen, American actress
 February 21
 Corbin Bleu, American actor and singer
 Scout Taylor-Compton, American actress and singer
 February 24 – Daniel Kaluuya, English actor
 February 29 - Angelababy, Hong Kong actress and singer
 March 1 – Daniella Monet, American actress and singer
 March 2 - Nathalie Emmanuel, English actress and model
 March 3 - Andrea Brooks, Canadian actress and model
 March 5
 Jake Lloyd, American actor
 Sterling Knight, American actor and musician
 March 11
Rainey Qualley, American actress and singer
Anton Yelchin, Russian-American actor (died 2016)
 March 15
Tom Bateman (actor), British actor
Caitlin Wachs, American actress
 March 17
Morfydd Clark, Welsh actress
Harry Melling (actor), English actor
 March 18 – Lily Collins, English-American actress
 March 20 – Xavier Dolan, Canadian actor and director
 March 21 – Takeru Sato, Japanese actor
 March 23 - Ayesha Curry, Canadian-American actress
 March 25
Matthew Beard (English actor), English actor and model
Aly Michalka, American actress and singer
 April 2 – Liis Lass, Estonian actress 
 April 5
Freddie Fox (actor), English actor, director and voice artist
Lily James, English actress
 April 8 - Gabriella Wilde, English model and actress
 April 18 – Alia Shawkat, American actress
 April 19 – Simu Liu, Canadian actor, writer, producer and stuntman
 April 26 - Luke Bracey, Australian actor
 April 29 – Gabriel Chavarria, American-Hispanic actor
 May 5 – Larissa Wilson, English actress
 May 10 – Lindsey Shaw, American actress
 May 16 – Pääru Oja, Estonian actor
 May 23 – Alberto Frezza, Italian–American actor
 May 24 - Tara Correa-McMullen, American actress (died 2005)
 May 29
Riley Keough, American actress
Mathew Waters, Australian actor
 June 3
Imogen Poots, English actress
Megumi Han, Japanese voice actress
 June 3 – Daniela Vega, Chilean actress
 June 12 - Jade Anouka, English actress
 June 14
Lucy Hale, American actress and singer
Courtney Halverson, American actress
 June 18 - Renee Olstead, American actress and singer
 June 20 – Christopher Mintz-Plasse, American actor
 June 23 - Marielle Jaffe, American actress, singer and model
 June 25
 Edgar Morais, Portuguese actor, director, producer, and screenwriter
 Rafael Morais, Portuguese actor, director, and screenwriter
 June 26 - Carlos Lopez (stuntman), American stunt performer (died 2014)
 June 27
Kimiko Glenn, American actress
Kelley Jakle, American actress and singer-songwriter
Matthew Lewis, English actor
 July 1
 Mitch Hewer, English actor
 Hannah Murray, English actress
 July 11 
 David Henrie, American actor
 Shareeka Epps, American actress
 July 12 - Phoebe Tonkin, Australian actress and model
 July 14 - Alisha Wainwright, American actress
 July 16 - Kim Woo-bin, South Korean actor
 July 21
Rory Culkin, American actor
Jasmine Cephas Jones, American actress, singer and producer
Juno Temple, English actress
Jing Tian, Chinese actress
Jamie Waylett, British former actor
 July 23 - Daniel Radcliffe, English actor
 July 27 - Charlotte Arnold, Canadian actress
 July 31
Alexis Knapp, American actress
Jessica Williams (actress), American actress and comedian
Zelda Williams, American actress, director, producer and writer
August 1 - Landry Allbright, American actress, writer and editor
 August 2 – Priscilla Betti, French actress
 August 10 – Brenton Thwaites, Australian actor
 August 14 – Artyom Bogucharsky, Russian actor 
 August 15 
 Joe Jonas, American singer and actor (Jonas Brothers)
 Carlos PenaVega, actor (Big Time Rush)
 August 18 - Anna Akana, American filmmaker, actress, comedian, musician and YouTuber
 August 21
Rob Knox, English actor (died 2008)
Hayden Panettiere, American actress and singer
 September 5
Thomas Cocquerel, Australian actor
Kat Graham, American actress, model, singer and dancer
Olivier Richters, Dutch bodybuilder, actor and model
 September 7
Loren Allred, American singer, songwriter and actress
Hannah John-Kamen, English actress
Jonathan Majors, American actor
Hugh Mitchell (actor), English actor
 September 14
Logan Henderson, actor (Big Time Rush)
Jesse James (actor), American actor
 September 17 - Danielle Brooks, American actress and singer
 September 19 - Lorenza Izzo, Chilean actress and model
 September 22 - Sofía Espinosa, Mexican actress, writer and director
 October 1 – Brie Larson, American actress
 October 4 – Dakota Johnson, American actress
 October 10 - Aimee Teegarden, American actress, model and producer
 October 14 – Mia Wasikowska, Australian actress
 October 24 - Shenae Grimes, Canadian actress
 October 30 - Dustin Ybarra, American stand-up comedian and actor
 November 3 - Elliott Tittensor, English actor
 November 10 – Taron Egerton, Welsh actor
 November 18 - Stephanie Nogueras, American actress
 November 20 - Cody Linley, American actor and singer
 November 22 - Alden Ehrenreich, American actor
 November 26 - Katie Sagona, American former child actress
 December 2 – Cassie Steele, Canadian actress and singer
 December 4 - Nafessa Williams, American actress
 December 7
Nicholas Hoult, English actor
Caleb Landry Jones, American actor and musician
 December 13 – Taylor Swift, American singer-songwriter, actress, and musician
 December 18 – Ashley Benson, American actress and model
 December 28 - Jessie Buckley, Irish actress and singer
 December 29
 Jane Levy, American actress
 Left Brain, American rapper

Deaths

Film debuts 
William Baldwin – Born on the Fourth of July
Hugo Blick – Batman
Adrien Brody – New York Stories
Vincent Cassel – Les cigognes n'en font qu'à leur tête
Michael Chiklis – Wired
Anna Chlumsky – Uncle Buck
Steve Coogan – Resurrected
Kevin Corrigan – Lost Angels
Kirsten Dunst – New York Stories
Ron Eldard – True Love
Thomas Mikal Ford – Harlem Nights
Vivica A. Fox – Born on the Fourth of July
Carla Gugino – Troop Beverly Hills
Jared Harris – The Rachel Papers
Teri Hatcher – The Big Picture
Rob Hedden (director) – Friday the 13th Part VIII: Jason Takes Manhattan
David Herman – Lost Angels
John Michael Higgins – Vampire's Kiss
Bryce Dallas Howard – Parenthood
Kelly Hu – Friday the 13th Part VIII: Jason Takes Manhattan
Toby Huss – Zadar! Cow from Hell
Michael Imperioli – Alexa
Jason Isaacs – The Tall Guy
Allison Janney – Who Shot Pat?
Jamie Kennedy – Skin Deep
Tom Kenny – How I Got Into College
Martin Lawrence – Do the Right Thing
Harry Lennix – The Package
Tobey Maguire – The Wizard
Matt Malloy – The Unbelievable Truth
Costas Mandylor – Triumph of the Spirit
Larry Miller – Three Fugitives
Kylie Minogue – The Delinquents
Michael Moore – Roger & Me
Mary-Louise Parker – Signs of Life
Nathaniel Parker – War Requiem
Rosie Perez – Do the Right Thing
John C. Reilly – Casualties of War
Sam Rockwell – Clownhouse
Rene Russo – Major League
Bill Sage – The Unbelievable Truth
Adam Sandler – Going Overboard
Annabella Sciorra – True Love
Molly Shannon – The Phantom of the Opera
Tom Sizemore – Lock Up
Emma Thompson – The Tall Guy
Aida Turturro – True Love
Michael Jai White – The Toxic Avenger Part II
Elijah Wood – Back to the Future Part II

See also
 List of American films of 1989
 List of British films of 1989
 List of French films of 1989
 List of German films of the 1980s
 List of Bollywood films of 1989
 List of Italian films of 1989
 List of Japanese films of 1989
 List of Swedish films of the 1980s

References

External links 
 "The Summer Of '89" – www.screenrush.co.uk
1989 Domestic Grosses at Box Office Mojo
Top 1989 Movies at the Domestic Box Office at The Numbers
Top 1989 Movies at the International Box Office at The Numbers
Top 1989 Movies at the Worldwide Box Office at The Numbers
Top-US-Grossing Titles Released 1989-01-01 to 1989-12-31 at IMDb
Most Popular Feature Films Released 1989-01-01 to 1989-12-31 at IMDb

 
Film by year